Moorthikuppam is a village in Bahour Commune of Bahour taluk  in the Union Territory of Puducherry, India. It lies on Pudukuppam-Soriyankuppam road. Pannithittu-Pudukuppam road also connects Moorthikuppam. Moorthikuppam is a part of Pudukuppam Village Panchayat.

Gallery

References

External links
Official website of the Government of the Union Territory of Puducherry

Villages in Puducherry district